Sérgio Pacheco de Oliveira (born 7 June 1981), commonly known as Sérgio, is a Brazilian former professional footballer who played as a midfielder.

Career
He began at home with football at Colegio, from whence he was brought to NAC Breda. In his first season at NAC Breda, 1999–2000, he became champion of the Eerste Divisie and was promoted to the Eredivisie, as he played 21 matches and scored 3 times. Sergio played in the Eredivisie two more seasons for NAC, where he made 51 appearances and scored 14 goals. Together with his compatriot Cristiano they moved to Roda JC together, where in 2005 he began his fourth season. In the previous three seasons he made 19 goals in 84 games. The attacking midfielder left in the summer of 2006 to Metalurh Donetsk. In the winter of 2008 he was transferred to Turkish club Sivasspor.

Sérgio signed a contract with Maltese Premier League club Tarxien Rainbows during the 2010–11 transfer window. There, found himself re-united with his former NAC Breda teammate Cristiano. In the 2011–12 season, he played at the second level in Mexico for Toros Neza, a feeder club of Monarcas Morelia. In 2013, he played for Duque de Caxias.

References

External links
 

1981 births
Living people
Brazilian footballers
NAC Breda players
Roda JC Kerkrade players
FC Metalurh Donetsk players
Sivasspor footballers
Brazilian expatriate sportspeople in Azerbaijan
Eredivisie players
Ukrainian Premier League players
Süper Lig players
Brazilian expatriate footballers
Expatriate footballers in the Netherlands
Expatriate footballers in Ukraine
Brazilian expatriate sportspeople in Ukraine
Expatriate footballers in Turkey
Shamakhi FK players
Expatriate footballers in Azerbaijan
Tarxien Rainbows F.C. players
Expatriate footballers in Malta
Expatriate footballers in Mexico
Toros Neza footballers
Association football midfielders
Duque de Caxias Futebol Clube players
Footballers from Rio de Janeiro (city)